James Powell Calvin was the head football coach for the Delaware State Hornets in 1931. He compiled a record of 2–2–1.

Head coaching record

References

Year of birth missing
Year of death missing
Delaware State Hornets football coaches